Victoria Park is a football ground in Buckie in north-east Scotland, which is the home ground of Highland Football League side Buckie Thistle. It is located at the junction of Midmar Street and South Pringle Street,  from the town centre. The ground has a capacity of 5,000 with 400 seated, and is currently the largest in the league.

History
Buckie Thistle moved to Victoria Park in 1919 with the first opponents at the ground being Aberdeen.

The record attendance at Victoria Park came in March 1958 when 8,168 spectators watched the club take on Falkirk in the third round of the Scottish Cup. Buckie Thistle narrowly lost 2–1 to the away team.

Transport
The ground is accessible by road via the A98, which runs to the south of Buckie between Fochabers, at the junction of the A96 in the east, to Fraserburgh in the west. By taking the exit along High Street (A942), Victoria Park is on the left down Midmar Street.

References

External links
Victoria Park at soccerway.com

Highland Football League venues
Sports venues in Moray
Buckie Thistle F.C.
Sports venues completed in 1919
Buckie